Mickey Lin Washington (born July 8, 1968) is a former professional American football player who played cornerback in the National Football League for eight seasons for the New England Patriots, Washington Redskins, Buffalo Bills, Jacksonville Jaguars, and New Orleans Saints.

After leaving the NFL, Washington obtained a lJuris Doctor degree from Texas Southern University Thurgood Marshall Marshall School of Law and is currently an attorney in private practice in Houston, Texas.

1968 births
Living people
People from Galveston, Texas
American football cornerbacks
Washington Redskins players
New England Patriots players
Buffalo Bills players
Jacksonville Jaguars players
New Orleans Saints players
Texas A&M Aggies football players
African-American players of American football
21st-century African-American people
20th-century African-American sportspeople